Patton's spiny-rat (Proechimys pattoni) is a spiny rat species found in Brazil and Peru.

Phylogeny
Morphological characters and mitochondrial cytochrome b DNA sequences showed that P. pattoni belongs to the so-called gardneri group of Proechimys species. Within this clade, Proechimys pattoni is more closely related to P. gardneri than to P. kulinae.

References

Proechimys
Mammals described in 1998
Taxa named by Maria Nazareth Ferreira da Silva